The Office for the Prevention and Investigation of Accidents in Civil Aviation and Rail (Gabinete de Prevenção e Investição de Acidentes com Aeronaves e de Acidentes Ferroviários, GPIAAF, "Office of Prevention and Investigation of Aircraft Accidents and Rail Accidents") is the Portuguese aviation and rail accident and incident investigation authority. The agency is headquartered in Lisbon. It is subordinate to the Ministry of Public Works, Transport and Communications.

See also

 Air Transat Flight 236

References

External links

Government of Portugal
Aviation organisations based in Portugal
Portugal